Belle River may refer to:

Canada 
 Belle River, Ontario, a community in Lakeshore, Ontario

France 
 Belle River, Saint Pierre and Miquelon

United States 
Belle River, Louisiana
Belle River (Louisiana), a river of Louisiana
Belle River, Michigan, an unincorporated community in St. Clair County
Belle River (Michigan), a tributary of the St. Clair River
Belle River Township, Douglas County, Minnesota

See also
Bell River (disambiguation)
Belle-Rivière (disambiguation)